Michael Shelton is a British sportsman who competed at the Summer Paralympic Games five times between 1960 and 1976 in snooker and other sports. He won six Paralympic medals, four gold, a silver and a bronze. He also won gold at the 1974 Commonwealth Paraplegic Games.

Shelton was from Newstead, Nottinghamshire and had been a miner at Newstead Colliery. His back was injured in 1958 by a roof fall, and he was paralysed from the waist down. In 1969 he married Iris Turner, who had been a nursing sister on his ward when he was in hospital.

He played for the Lodge Moor Hospital paraplegic snooker team, which in 1974 was refused entry to the Sheffield and District Works Sports Association league, on the basis that they would gain unfair advantage from playing all of their fixtures at their home venue, apparently failing to acknowledge that the team would be unable to play at other venues with stairs or limited space around the tables. The team was subsequently given the chance to participate in the Sheffield Social Snooker League and play all their games at their own home base.

Paralympic career
In 1960, at the inaugural Paralympic Games in Rome, Shelton won a silver medal in the snooker, he had also competed in the precision javelin throw and shot put C where he finished 41st and 24th respectively in the events. He followed this up with three consecutive gold medals, at the 1964 Tokyo Paralympics, 1968 Tel Aviv Paralympics, and 1972 Heidelberg Paralympics.

At the 1976 Toronto Paralympics, Shelton won bronze in the Men's 2-5 Snooker, but took the gold medal in the lawn bowls, men's singles wh.

References

External links
 
 Hero's welcome for Paralympic snooker champion Michael Shelton (1965)

Year of birth missing (living people)
Living people
British coal miners
English snooker players
English male bowls players
Wheelchair category Paralympic competitors
Paralympic athletes of Great Britain
Paralympic lawn bowls players of Great Britain
Paralympic snooker players of Great Britain
Paralympic gold medalists for Great Britain
Paralympic silver medalists for Great Britain
Paralympic bronze medalists for Great Britain
Paralympic medalists in snooker
Snooker players at the 1960 Summer Paralympics
Snooker players at the 1964 Summer Paralympics
Snooker players at the 1968 Summer Paralympics
Snooker players at the 1972 Summer Paralympics
Snooker players at the 1976 Summer Paralympics
Athletes (track and field) at the 1968 Summer Paralympics
Lawn bowls players at the 1976 Summer Paralympics
Medalists at the 1960 Summer Paralympics
Medalists at the 1964 Summer Paralympics
Medalists at the 1968 Summer Paralympics
Medalists at the 1972 Summer Paralympics
Medalists at the 1976 Summer Paralympics
English male javelin throwers
English male shot putters
Wheelchair javelin throwers
Wheelchair shot putters
Paralympic javelin throwers
Paralympic shot putters